The 2016–17 Texas Longhorns men's basketball team represented the University of Texas at Austin in the 2016–17 NCAA Division I men's basketball season. They were led by second-year head coach Shaka Smart and played their home games at the Frank Erwin Center in Austin, Texas as members of the Big 12 Conference. They finished the season 11–22, 4–14 in Big 12 play play to finish in last place. They defeated Texas Tech in the first round of the Big 12 tournament to advance to the quarterfinals where they lost to West Virginia.

Previous season
The Longhorns finished the 2015–16 season 20–13, 11–7 in Big 12 play to finish in fourth place in conference. They lost in the quarterfinals of the Big 12 tournament to Baylor. They received an at-large bid to the NCAA tournament where they lost in the First Round to Northern Iowa.

Departures

Incoming transfers

Recruiting

Recruiting class of 2017

Roster

Schedule and results

|-
!colspan=6 style=| Exhibition

|-
!colspan=12 style=| Regular season

|-
!colspan=6 style=| Big 12 Tournament

Rankings

*AP does not release post-NCAA tournament rankings

See also
 2016–17 Texas Longhorns women's basketball team

References

Texas
Texas Longhorns men's basketball seasons
Texas Longhorns
Texas Longhorns